Events in the year 1993 in Colombia.

Incumbents 
 President: César Gaviria

Events 
19 May - The SAM Colombia Flight 501 crashed, killing 132 people.

Births 
15 January – Paulina Vega, model and actress (Miss Universe 2014).
18 January – Juan Fernando Quintero, footballer.
24 January – Kevin Ríos, track cyclist.
28 February – Éder Álvarez Balanta, footballer
8 March – Kevin Roldán, singer

Deaths 
3 February – Omar Cañas, 23, footballer.
11 September – Luis Antonio Escobar, 68, composer and musicologist.
8 November – Francisco Zuluaga, 64, footballer.
25 November – Juan Carlos Castillo, 29, racing cyclist.
2 December – Pablo Escobar, 44, drug lord and narcoterrorist.

References 

 
Colombia
Colombia
1990s in Colombia
Years of the 21st century in Colombia